Azizur Rahman ministry was created from 15 April 1979 to 24 March 1982. The cabinet served under President Ziaur Rahman till the assassination of Ziaur Rahman.

List of Cabinet Ministers

State Ministers

Deputy Ministers

References 

Politics of Bangladesh
Cabinets established in 1981